Sketches of Tokyo is an album by John Hicks and David Murray released on the Japanese DIW label. It was released in 1986 and features six duo performances by Murray and Hicks.

Reception
The Allmusic review awarded the album 4 stars.

Track listing
 "Epistrophy" (Monk) - 4:26 
 "Blues In The Pocket" (Hicks) - 7:40 
 "Naima" (Coltrane) 9:16 
 "New Life" (Murray) - 8:38 
 "God Bless The Child" (Herzog, Holliday) - 7:41 
 "Sketches of Tokyo" (Hicks) - 7:08 
Recorded April 11, 1985 at Avaco Studio, Tokyo

Personnel
David Murray - tenor saxophone, bass clarinet
John Hicks - piano

References 

1986 albums
David Murray (saxophonist) albums
DIW Records albums
John Hicks (jazz pianist) albums